Manavalakurichi is a panchayat town in Kanniyakumari district in the Indian state of Tamil Nadu. It is hardly 60 km from Thiruvananthapuram, the capital city of Kerala. Tamil and Malayalam are the common languages of people living here.

It has an average elevation of ).

Indian Rare Earths
 On 18 August 1950, Indian Rare Earths Limited (IREL) was incorporated as a private limited company -jointly owned by the Government of India and Government of Travancore, Cochin with the primary intention of taking up commercial scale processing of monazite sand at its first unit namely Rare Earths Division(RED), Aluva, Kerala for the recovery of thorium.
 After becoming a full-fledged Central Government Undertaking in 1963 under the administrative control of Department of Atomic Energy(DAE), IREL took over a number of private companies engaged in mining and separation of beach sand minerals in southern part of the country and established two more Divisions one at Chavara, Kerala and the other at Manavalakurichi(MK), Tamil Nadu.
 After a gap of about 20 years, IREL commissioned its largest Division called Orissa Sand Complex(OSCOM) at Chatrapur, Orissa. Today IREL operates these four units with Corporate Office in Mumbai and produces/sells six heavy minerals namely ilmenite, rutile, zircon, monazite, sillimanite and garnet as well as various value added products. IREL is making profit since 1997–98 with its sales turnover reaching a peak exceeding Rs. 3600 million in 2006–07, with export component of above Rs. 1000 million.

Even though IREL provides many employment opportunities to locals here, people are against this company due to the fear of Nuclear Radiation emission from this unit.

Sea ports

Jeppiaar Fishing Harbour in Muttom is the nearest Sea Port. This is a private sea port and was built by educationalist and business man Jeppiaar.

Another nearest sea port is Kolachal. It is an ancient port, aging back to 18th century. Vasco da Gama called it ‘Colachi’. After the defeat of the Dutch by King Anizham Thirunal Marthanda Varma in Battle of Colachel on 10 August 1741, a victory pillar had been erected near the beach in commemoration of the victory.

Roads
The town is well connected to all parts of the state through road. Nagercoil, the district headquarters of Kanyakumari is situated 20 km from Manavalakurichi in the north-east direction. Direct bus service from Manavalakurichi is available to Thiruvananthapuram the capital city of Kerala. This journey usually takes less than 2 hrs by road. Frequent bus service to Thuckalay another town which is 11 km away is also available.

Rail

Eraniel railway station is the nearest railway station. The station has two platforms and falls on the Kanyakumari–Thiruvananthapuram line in the Thiruvananthapuram division of the Southern Railway zone. All daily trains passing through the station halts in Eraniel station. The route from Eraniel to Thiruvananthapuram is an exciting journey as the line runs through tunnels and hilly terrains. It takes only 1 hr from Thiruvananthapuram to Eraniel by train. The famous Mandaikadu Bagavathi Amman Temple, Kolachal Port, I.R.E Industries in Manavalakurichi and Padmanabhapuram Palace are situated nearby the Station. The station also is the nearest railhead for two municipalities – Padmanabapuram, Colachel and for 25 villages.

Air

The nearest international airport is Thiruvananthapuram International Airport . Thiruvananthapuram connects the town further to other major cities like Bangalore, Mumbai, Cochin, Delhi, Goa, and Chennai by air.

Demographics
 India census, had a total population of 10,969 with males 5478 marginally less over females 5491. Manavalakurichi has an average literacy rate of 79%, higher than the national average of 59.5%: male literacy is 81%, and female literacy is 77%. In Manavalakurichi, 11% of the population is under 6 years of age.

References

https://web.archive.org/web/20100903140542/http://irel.gov.in/scripts/about_us.asp

5. Fish Market ( Veg. & Non Veg. ) - Manavalakurichy

Cities and towns in Kanyakumari district